Whitby is a town in Durham Region. Whitby is located in Southern Ontario east of Ajax and west of Oshawa, on the north shore of Lake Ontario and is home to the headquarters of Durham Region. It had a population of 138,501 at the 2021 census. While the southern portion of Whitby is predominantly urban and an economic hub, the northern part of the municipality is more rural and includes the communities of Ashburn, Brooklin, Myrtle, Myrtle Station, and Macedonian Village.

History

Whitby Township (now the Town of Whitby) was named after the seaport town of Whitby, Yorkshire, England.

When the township was originally surveyed in 1792, the surveyor, from the northern part of England, named the townships east of Toronto after towns in northeastern England: York, Scarborough, Pickering, Whitby and Darlington. The original name of "Whitby" is Danish, dating from about 867 AD when the Danes invaded Britain. It is a contraction of "Whitteby", meaning "White Village". The allusion may be to the white lighthouse on the pier at Whitby, Yorkshire, and also at Whitby, Ontario.' Although settlement dates back to 1800, it was not until 1836 that a downtown business centre was established by Whitby's founder Peter Perry.

Whitby's chief asset was its fine natural harbour on Lake Ontario, from which grain from the farmland to the north was first shipped in 1833. In the 1840s, a road was built from Whitby Harbour to Lake Simcoe and Georgian Bay, to bring trade and settlement through the harbour to and from the rich hinterland to the north. The Town of Whitby was chosen as the seat of government for the newly formed County of Ontario in 1852, and incorporated in 1855. The remainder of Whitby Township remained a separate municipality, although the eastern half surrounding Oshawa was incorporated as the new Township of East Whitby in 1857. In the 1870s, a railway, the "Port Whitby and Port Perry Railway", was constructed from Whitby harbour to Port Perry, and later extended to Lindsay as the "Whitby, Port Perry and Lindsay Railway".

Whitby is also the site of Trafalgar Castle School, a private girls' school founded in 1874. The building, constructed as an Elizabethan-style castle in 1859–62 as a private residence for the Sheriff of Ontario County, is a significant architectural landmark and Whitby's only provincial historic site marked with a plaque. The school celebrated its 125th anniversary in 1999.

During the Second World War, Whitby was the location of Camp X, a secret spy training facility established by Sir William Stephenson, the "Man Called Intrepid". Although the buildings have since been demolished, a monument was unveiled on the site of Camp X in 1984 by Ontario's Lieutenant Governor John Black Aird. Following the War, Soviet dissenter Igor Gouzenko was taken to the facility with his wife to live in secretive protective custody after fleeing Ottawa, Ontario.

Amalgamation

In 1968, the Town of Whitby and Township of Whitby amalgamated to form the current municipality. Planning for the construction of a town hall intended to centralize municipal staff working in satellite offices began in 1970 under mayor Des Newman. Construction began on the Raymond Moriyama designed building in 1975; it was opened by Mayor Jim Gartshore on January 8, 1977.

Municipal boundaries were not changed during the 1974 formation of Durham Region, and remain to this day. Today, Whitby is the seat of government in Durham Region. It is commonly considered part of the Greater Toronto Area, although statistically it belongs to the greater Oshawa Metropolitan Area. They are both in the eastern part of the Golden Horseshoe region.

Geography

Whitby borders Ajax to the west, Pickering to the northwest, the Township of Scugog to the north, and Oshawa to the east. Since at least the mid-1990s, the development of subdivisions to accommodate population growth has proceeded in a mostly northward direction, including development in Brooklin.

Demographics

In 2021, 19.1% of the population was under 15 years of age, and 14.8% was 65 years and over. The median age in Whitby was 40 years.

The median total income of households in 2020 for Whitby was $123,000.

Ethnicity 
As per the 2021 census, the most common ethnic or cultural origins in Whitby are English (19.9%), Irish (17.1%), Scottish (16.7%), Canadian (13.7%), Italian (6.4%), German (6.2%), Indian (6.0%), French (5.4%), British Isles (4.8%), Chinese (4.3%), Jamaican (3.5%), Dutch (3.4%), and Polish (3.0%). Indigenous people made up 1.5% of the population, mostly First Nations (0.8%) and Métis (0.7%). Ethnocultural backgrounds in the town included European (63.1%), South Asian (12.0%), Black (9.1%), Chinese (3.6%), Filipino (2.6%), West Asian (1.6%), Latin American (1.2%), Arab (1.0%), and Southeast Asian (0.5%).

Note: Totals greater than 100% due to multiple origin responses.

Religion 
In 2021, 54.3% of the population identified as Christian, with Catholics (25.7%) making up the largest denomination, followed by Anglican (4.9%), United Church (4.2%), Orthodox (2.7%), and other denominations. 31.6% of the population reported no religious affiliation. Others identified as Muslim (6.7%), Hindu (5.4%), and with other religions.

Language 
The 2021 census found English to be the mother tongue of 75.5% of the population. This was followed by Urdu (1.7%), Tamil (1.6%), Mandarin (1.5%), French (1.3%), Spanish (1.1%), Italian (1.0%), Tagalog (0.9%), Cantonese (0.8%), Arabic (0.7%), Hindi (0.7%), Dari (0.7%), and Portuguese (0.6%). Of the official languages, 98.7% of the population reported knowing English and 8.4% French.

Local government

The Town's Council includes the Mayor, four Regional Councillors and four Town Councillors elected on the basis of one per ward. They sit on both the Town and Durham Regional Councils, as does the mayor. The members elected as of the 2022 municipal election are:

Mayor: Elizabeth Roy

Regional Councillors:

 Rhonda Mulcahy
 Chris Leahy 
 Steve Yamada 
 Maleeha Shahid

Town Councillors:

 North Ward 1: Steve Lee 
 West Ward 2: Matt Cardwell
 Centre Ward 3: Niki Lundquist
 East Ward 4: Victoria Bozinovski

Regional Chair: John Henry 

Whitby is also home to the headquarters buildings of Durham Region and the Durham District School Board.

Emergency services
Whitby is policed by the Durham Regional Police's Central West Division. There is also a detachment of the Ontario Provincial Police located in Town, mainly to patrol area provincial highways within Durham Region. Whitby Fire & Emergency Services provides firefighting services from five fire stations and ambulance/emergency medical services are provided by Durham Region EMS at the Whitby Paramedic Station (also as EMS Headquarters).

Economy
Many residents commute to work in other Greater Toronto Area communities. Whitby itself is home to a steel mill operated by Gerdau Ameristeel, a retail support centre operated by Sobeys, and a major Liquor Control Board of Ontario warehouse. Other companies present in Whitby include pharmaceutical manufacturer Patheon, Lear Corporation, Automodular Assemblies, McGraw-Hill Ryerson, and several others.

Education
Public education in Whitby is provided via the Durham District School Board, which also has its headquarters in Whitby. There are twenty-four elementary schools and five secondary schools: Anderson Collegiate Vocational Institute, Brooklin High School, Donald A Wilson Secondary School, Henry Street High School and Sinclair Secondary School.

The Durham Catholic District School Board oversees public Catholic education in Durham Region. There are twelve Catholic elementary schools and two secondary schools- Father Leo J. Austin Catholic Secondary School and All Saints Catholic Secondary School.

Full French-language education is provided by the Conseil scolaire catholique MonAvenir. There is one elementary school in Whitby, École élémentaire catholique Jean-Paul II (JK-grade 6), as well as a high school, École secondaire catholique St-Charles Garnier (grades 7-12) which services all of Durham Region.

As noted above, Whitby is home to Trafalgar Castle School, an independent school for women that offers grades 5 through 12 in a university preparatory programme. Built in 1859 by the flamboyant Sheriff of Ontario County, Nelson Gilbert "Iron" Reynolds, Trafalgar Castle remains a unique Canadian treasure. The school had opened its doors in 1874 and was called "Ontario Ladies' College" until the late 70s, after which it changed its name to "Trafalgar Castle".

There are also a number of Montessori schools offering programmes for early elementary grades.

Whitby is also the site of the Skills Training Centre of Durham College. The main campus of the college is located in Oshawa, as is Ontario Tech University. Canada Christian College is located in Whitby as well.

Healthcare
Although Whitby is one of the 100 largest cities/towns in Canada, it lacks a full-service hospital. The town was served by the Whitby General Hospital until 1998, when Durham hospitals were amalgamated by the Lakeridge Health Corporation, Under the amalgamated system, the hospital became Lakeridge Health Whitby and is a specialized health centre, with the closest full-service hospitals being Lakeridge Health Oshawa, Markham Stouffville Hospital in Markham and the Rouge Valley Health System, Ajax and Pickering campus in Ajax.

The Ontario Shores Centre for Mental Health Sciences is located on the lakefront. It was originally called the Whitby Psychiatric Hospital, then Whitby Mental Health Centre.

Transportation
Ontario Highway 401 runs through the south end of Whitby, with interchanges at Brock Street and Thickson Road. Ontario Highway 407 was opened in Whitby in 2016. The toll highway passes between Brooklin and the urban portion of the town. Ontario Highway 412, connecting the 401 with the 407, also opened to traffic in the same year. The highway is a north–south route located just east of the Whitby-Ajax boundary and became toll-free on April 22, 2022.

The southern terminus of Highway 12 is also located in Whitby. It originally extended from Highway 401 northward as part of Brock Street, but this portion was downloaded to Durham Region in 1997. The southern terminus is now located just south of Brooklin at Highway 407. Finally, Highway 7 runs east–west between Brooklin and the City of Pickering. At Brooklin, the road changes to a north–south alignment and is multiplexed with Highway 12 to the northern boundary of the Town.

Four railways pass through Whitby. The Toronto-Montreal corridor main lines of the Canadian National Railway and Canadian Pacific Railway both pass east–west through the south end of town. A second CP line running from Toronto to Havelock also passes through the northern part of Whitby. Via Rail trains travel through Whitby, but the nearest station is in Oshawa. Finally, GO Transit provides frequent service via its Lakeshore East line, which (in Whitby) runs parallel to the CN tracks. A GO Station is located in Town.

Local transit services are provided by the region-wide Durham Region Transit. Prior to the Regional service, the Town provided its own service. GO Transit buses also connect Whitby with Durham Region (including Port Perry and Beaverton to the north) and areas further afield.

Whitby Harbour, an important factor in the development of the Town, is now home to a 420-berth recreational marina.

Media
Whitby is served by the Whitby This Week newspaper, part of the Metroland Media Group. Several other papers have been published in the town over the years, including the Whitby Free Press, which ran from 1971 to 1996. Other GTA media outlets also serve the area.

In North Whitby, the Brooklin Town Crier serves approximately 8,000 residents every two weeks. The Brooklin Town Crier was established in 2000 by Rhonda Mulcahy, who has since been elected Regional Councillor for Whitby. The paper consists primarily of resident contributions, with occasion updates on local and regional politics from Mulcahy.

Arts 

 Durham Council for the Arts
 Whitby Brass Band
 Whitby Courthouse Theatre
 Station Gallery

Notable places 
Camp X
Whitby Public Library
Lynde House Museum
Cullen Gardens and Miniature Village

Sports

Whitby's most famous sporting team is the Whitby Dunlops, a celebrated ice hockey squad that captured the world championship in 1958 at Oslo, Norway. This team featured long-time president of the Boston Bruins, Harry Sinden and former mayor of Whitby, Bob Attersley. The Dunlops were revived in 2004 as part of the Eastern Ontario Senior Hockey League.

The Whitby Yacht Club, which offers racing, cruising, social, and sail training programs on Whitby Harbour overlooking the Lake Ontario, was founded in 1966.

Lacrosse is also a prominent sport in Whitby. The Brooklin Redmen Senior A lacrosse club is one of the most successful in Canadian sporting history, while the Junior A Whitby Warriors have been awarded the Minto Cup four times since 1984.

Whitby is also home to the Iroquois Park Sports Centre, one of the largest minor sports centres in North America. The facility includes six icepads, a swimming pool named for local Olympian Anne Ottenbrite, six tennis courts, five ball diamonds, three batting cages, a skatepark, a soccer pitch, The Sports Garden Cafe restaurant and the Whitby Sports Hall of Fame. Whitby also developed the McKinney Sports complex which boasts three ice pads, two tennis courts and a skatepark, and Luther Vipond Arena in Brooklin, with one ice pad. These 3 sport complexes hold many sporting events.

In 2008, the OJHL relocated a team to Whitby to play out of the Iroquois Complex, known as the Whitby Fury.

Notable people
David Ayres, NHL hockey goalie and Zamboni driver
John Wilson Bengough, political cartoonist
Kat Burns and Kyle Donnelly of the band Forest City Lovers
 Drake Caggiula, hockey player for the Chicago Blackhawks
 Lorne Edgar Campbell, outlaw biker
Caroline Nichols Churchill, American feminist, author, and editor
Chuck Coles, singer/songwriter for the Organ Thieves, southern and soul-influenced experimental hard rock band
A. J. Cook, actress
Neil Crone, actor and writer for local newspaper, stars on kid's television show Really Me
Dave Devall, weather reporter for CFTO-TV
Jim Flaherty, late member of the House of Commons of Canada and Minister of Finance
Adam Foote, NHL player for Colorado Avalanche, Stanley Cup winner, Olympic Gold Medallist and former member of Team Canada
Hamar Greenwood, Chief Secretary for Ireland 1920–1922
Zack Greer, plays for the Denver Outlaws in the MLL and the Colorado Mammoth of the NLL. 
Jay Harrison, hockey player, currently an unrestricted free agent
Hello Beautiful, band
May Irwin, businesswoman, pioneer film actress, singer and star of vaudeville, participant in first screen kiss in cinematic history in Thomas Edison's 1896 film The Kiss
K-os, rapper, singer, songwriter and record producer
John LaFontaine, member of the Saskatchewan Rush of the NLL
James Logan, hockey player for the Berlin Dutchmen
Priscilla Lopes-Schliep, bronze medallist in the hurdles at the 2008 Olympics
Andrew Martin (1975-2009), WWE wrestler, best known by his ring name, "Test"
Leslie McFarlane, writer of the Hardy Boys novels
Lori Melien, Olympic Bronze Medallist swimmer
Aaron Milton (born 1992), Canadian football player
Andrea Muizelaar, winner of Canada's Next Top Model
James Neal, NHL hockey player for the Edmonton Oilers
Joe Nieuwendyk, NHL hockey player, Stanley Cup winner, Olympic Gold Medallist and former member of Team Canada, Hockey Hall of Fame Inductee (2011)
Anne Ottenbrite, Olympic Gold Medallist swimmer
J. F. Paxton (1857–1936), Canadian ice hockey administrator
Thomas Paxton, Ontario politician, businessman, sheriff
Cole Perfetti 10th overall draft pick in the 2020 NHL entry draft
Keith Primeau, former NHL player
Wayne Primeau, former NHL player
Protest The Hero, progressive metal band
Gavin Prout, National Lacrosse League player with Colorado Mammoth
Paul Ranger, NHL player for Tampa Bay Lightning and Toronto Maple Leafs
Liam Reddox, hockey player
Gary Roberts, former NHL player
Sid Ryan, president of the Ontario Federation of Labour
O. J. Santiago, NFL football player
Tyler Seguin, ice hockey player for the Dallas Stars
Kailen Sheridan, pro soccer player, Olympian, alternate goalkeeper of the Rio 2016 team
J. Torres, comic book writer
Kristina Vaculik, member of the London 2012 Olympic artistic gymnastics team, who helped Canada place fifth in the team finals
Kelita Zupancic, Judoka and Olympian, member of the London 2012 Canadian Olympic Judo team also World Ranked No. 1 in 2013

Sister cities
 Feldkirch, Vorarlberg, Austria
 Longueuil, Canada
 Whitby, UK

See also
 Camp X
 Cullen Gardens and Miniature Village (a major tourist attraction, now closed)
 Whitby GO Station
 Whitby Public Library
 Whitby Psychiatric Hospital

Notes

References

Ed McPherson 'The Whitby Yacht Club: 25 years in the making' Whitby, Ont. : Whitby Yacht Club, c1992.

External links

 

 
Lower-tier municipalities in Ontario
Populated places on Lake Ontario in Canada
Towns in Ontario